Zeldathon is a biannual video game charity marathon, broadcast live on Twitch. Traditionally, every major video game in The Legend of Zelda series is completed back-to-back throughout the event, over the course of several days. Viewers are encouraged to donate directly to a selected charity in order to reach various goals and motivate the attendees to perform various challenges, such as playing the game upside down, or dressing up as a recurring video game character.

As of 2021, more than 100 people from across the world have participated in the event, with the most recent instances featuring over 70 attendees each.  Over the course of 26 marathons, the team has raised more than $3 million for various charitable causes.

At the conclusion of the 22nd marathon, a documentary on the event's history, Money Making Game, was announced with a projected release of December 2019 to celebrate Zeldathon's 10th anniversary. The documentary was premiered at the 25th marathon, Zeldathon Forces.

Founding
Zeldathon was first organized in late 2009 between Matthew “MC” Moffit and Zak Ondish, having taken inspiration from other charity gaming marathons such as TheSpeedGamers.

Following the first marathon, motivation was low to continue to create another event.  However, another attendee of the initial event wanted to do a second as a high school senior project. Moffit agreed to help, and they planned and executed a second summer event.  Following this, the marathon continued to return twice annually, in the summer and winter, with occasional mini-marathons being held as needed.

Honors
In September 2016, the Zeldathon Team was awarded the "Help Award" by Help Hope Live, for excellence in fund-raising following their fifteenth marathon, Zeldathon Hope.  The award was given as a direct result of their effort in raising more than $250,000 for Help Hope Live in the 150-hour event.

List of marathons
There have been 27 mainline marathons to date, with the next event planned for 2022.

Piece of Heart
In addition to their primary marathons, in 2019 the Zeldathon Team announced Piece of Heart, a convention-based charity event featuring Zeldathon participants.

Side Quest
At the end of Zeldathon Forces, the Zeldathon Team announced Zeldathon Parallel Worlds, an event focusing on non-Zelda titles. The team has said that this is its own line of events, rather than part of the main list of Zeldathon marathons. While originally planned to begin on June 4, 2020, it was announced in March 2020 that the event would be delayed due to the COVID-19 outbreak.

In the same March 2020 announcement as the delay of Parallel Worlds, it was revealed that an online-only event would be held in its place, scheduled to begin on June 5, in support of Direct Relief. The event was later given the title of Side Quest.  On June 3, it was announced that Side Quest would be delayed in solidarity with the Black Lives Matter movement following the George Floyd protests, with a new starting date of August 7 announced in July.

References

External links
 

2009 establishments in the United States
2009 in Internet culture
Charity events in the United States
Internet properties established in 2009
Internet-based activism
Livestreams
The Legend of Zelda
Twitch (service)